

Diving

Swimming

Men's events

Women's events

Synchronised swimming

Commonwealth Games
1986 Commonwealth Games events
1986